Dana East (born 10 June 2002) is an Australian rules footballer playing for the Fremantle Football Club in the AFL Women's (AFLW). East was drafted by Fremantle with their second selection, and 31st overall in the 2021 AFL Women's draft.

East made her debut in the opening round of the 2022 AFLW season. In her second game, she was praised for her efforts early in the game, and was awarded 5 votes in the AFL Coaches Association AFLW Champion Player of the Year award. She was nominated for the 2022 AFL Women's Rising Star award after performing well in round 9, when a depleted Fremantle side due to Covid-19 Health and Safety protocols, was beaten by a record margin by Melbourne.

A former basketballer from Manjimup, her father, Heath, also played football, for East Perth in the West Australian Football League.

References

External links 

2002 births
Living people
Fremantle Football Club (AFLW) players
Australian rules footballers from Western Australia